Chirodipterus australis is an extinct species of lungfish which lived during the Devonian period. Fossils have been found in Australia.

See also

Chirodipterus paddyensis

References

External links
 Chirodipterus at The Digital Morphology library

Prehistoric lungfish
Devonian bony fish
Prehistoric fish of Australia